Ubriaco is an Italian surname. Notable people with the surname include:

 Darío Ubriaco (born 1972), Uruguayan football referee
 Gene Ubriaco (born 1937), Canadian ice hockey executive and player

Italian-language surnames